Group A of the 2011 FIFA Women's World Cup consisted of the teams from Germany, Canada, Nigeria and France. The games were played on 26 June, 30 June and 5 July 2011. The top two teams advanced to the knockout stage.

Standings

Matches

Nigeria vs France

Germany vs Canada

Canada vs France

Germany vs Nigeria

France vs Germany

Canada vs Nigeria
At 22:13 CEST, in the 72nd minute, the match was interrupted due to a power outage of the stadium's floodlights. The match resumed at 22:24 CEST. Though the elapsed time was initially counted in the match report, FIFA later amended the minutes of the match events to exclude the stoppage of play caused by the power outage.

References

External links
Group A on fifa.com

Group A
Group
Group
Group
2010–11 in Nigerian football